Raval may refer to
Outskirt (Al-Andalus)
Raval (surname)
 El Raval, a neighbourhood in Barcelona, Spain
Raval River in Gujarat, western India 
Raval Yogi, a Hindu community found in Gujarat and Rajasthan